Squishface Studio is an open comics studio, retail, and co-working space for comic artists and illustrators in Brunswick, Australia. It was founded in November 2011 by Ben Hutchings, Sarah Howell, David Blumenstein, Marta Tesoro, Arran McKenna and Sacha Bryning, and formally opened to the public on January 26, 2012. As of 2019, Hutchings and Blumenstein continue to be resident artists.

Squishface is known as a community hub for comics in Australia; it is the only permanent comics maker space in the country and one of few in the world that is open to the public. It also publishes comics; three editions of the anthology Squishzine Brunstown have been released. The first won a Bronze Ledger award in 2015.

History 
In 2011, eight Melbourne comic artists were invited by the National Gallery of Victoria to spend a month in residency at the NGV Studio space at Federation Square. Two were Sarah Howell and Ben Hutchings, who decided, along with four other local comic artists, to establish a permanent space that would function in a similar way.

Squishface Studio, located at 309 Victoria St, Brunswick, is a single room shop front in which eight to twelve artists are typically resident at any given time. It was previously a bridal shop. It supports itself financially by memberships and running classes.

Studio activities 
The studio's major events are the Squishface Coaster Show (a parody of the Linden Postcard Show), Squishface anniversary events and the monthly drawing night (first Wednesday of each month). At different times the studio has also held Ladies' Drawing Auxiliary, a showcase for the work of non-male comics makers, book launches, children's classes and exhibitions.

Squishface has also been heavily involved in the Homecooked Comics Festival, which was run for several years by Squishface artists Sarah Howell and Clea Chiller and has now been passed on to Black Inc publicity and marketing manager Marian Blythe.

Resident artists 
The following artists have been resident in the studio.

 Ben Hutchings
 Sarah Howell
David Blumenstein
Marta Tesoro
Arran McKenna
Sacha Bryning
Jo Waite
Scarlette Baccini
 Patrick Alexander
Lily Mae Martin
Laura Renfrew
Scott Reid
Jess Parker
Teags Humm
Alexander Trevisan
Agathe de Gennes
Jase Harper
Lucy Fekete
Haydn Kwan
Natalie Britten
Samantha Ee
 Danny Stanley
Chris Gooch
Grace Reeves
Eleri Mai Harris
Emily Hearn
 Mark Ingram
Drew Turketo
Ele Jenkins
Ive Sorocuk
Alex Clark
Jonathan Vyssaritis
Lauren (Hills) Bedggood
Rebecca Clements
Andrea Crisp
Sophia Parsons Cope
Clea Chiller
 Simon Howe
Marlo Mogensen
Verity Sathasivam
 Simon Wall
Nicola Mitchell
Martin Nixon
Tom Winspear
Ariel Ries
Sam Emery
Sarah Firth
Issey Fujishima
Priscilla Ong

Projects worked on at the studio 

Jase Harper's graphic novel Awkwood
Chris Gooch's graphic novels Bottled
Ben Hutchings' graphic novel The Invisible War

See also 

 Comics in Australia
 List of Australian comics creators

References

Sources 

 Squishface Studio, About
Blumenstein, David. "Squishface Studio: A Physical Hub for Comics in Melbourne".
 Caterson, Simon. "Chris Gooch’s debut graphic novel; Monkey Grip for Millennials", Daily Review (Dec 30, 2017).
 Maynard, Amy. "The Melbourne Scene: A Case Study of Comics Production, City Spaces, and The Creative Industries".
 Blumenstein, David. "Stanleys 2013: The Australian Cartoonists Association conference (part 1)" (Oct 29, 2013).
Squishface Studio, "Squishface Studio's response to Australia Council cuts" (26 June 2015).

External links

2011 establishments in Australia
Publishing companies established in 2011
Australian cartoonists
Australian comics artists
Australian artist groups and collectives
Comic book publishing companies of Australia